Doğan Can Gölpek (born 27 November 1994) is a Dutch footballer of Turkish descent who plays as forward.

Club career
Gölpek began his career with the amateur side SV Meerssen, and after 4 successful seasons with them moved to MVV Maastricht in the Tweede Divisie. He made his Eerste Divisie debut for MVV Maastricht on 18 August 2017 in a game against Go Ahead Eagles. He was recruited to the Turkish club 1922 Konyaspor. After a debut season marred by injuries, he recovered and had a successful sophomore year, earning him a transfer to the Süper Lig with Konyaspor.

Personal life
Born in the Netherlands, Gölpek is of Turkish descent.

References

External links
 
 
 

1994 births
Living people
Sportspeople from Bergen op Zoom
Dutch footballers
Dutch people of Turkish descent
SV Meerssen players
MVV Maastricht players
Konyaspor footballers
Süper Lig players
Eerste Divisie players
Association football forwards
Footballers from North Brabant
Dutch expatriate sportspeople in Turkey
Dutch expatriate footballers
Expatriate footballers in Turkey